La Pobla de Benifassà is a municipality in the comarca of Baix Maestrat in the Valencian Community, Spain.

It is located in the historical comarca of Tinença de Benifassà. Most villages in the area have only residual population owing to massive emigration in the late 20th century.

The Ulldecona Dam is located within the La Pobla de Benifassà municipal limits.

Villages
 El Ballestar
 El Boixar
 Santa Maria de Benifassà monastery
 Coratxà
 Fredes
 Mangraner
 Mas del Molí de l'Abat
 La Pobla de Benifassà
 Sant Pere

See also
 Ports de Tortosa-Beseit

References

External links 

 Web de la Tinença de Benifassà
 Coratxà
 País Valencià, poble a poble, comarca a comarca
 Institut Valencià d'Estadística
 Direcció General d'Administració Local de la Generalitat

Municipalities in the Province of Castellón
Baix Maestrat